Quarto is a comune (municipality) in the Metropolitan City of Naples in the Italian region Campania, located about 11 km northwest of Naples.

Quarto borders the following municipalities: Giugliano in Campania, Marano di Napoli, Naples, Pozzuoli, Villaricca. The local football club for the comune is A.S.D. Quarto.

References

External links
 Official website

Cities and towns in Campania
Phlegraean Fields